The Los Gurkos Short Film Festival is an Austrian film festival. It was created in 2005 and takes place every year in Innsbruck, Austria. The main focus of the festival is on the short film competition, which provides a possibility for local and international filmmakers to present their craft. At the same time, the festival promotes the genre of the short in Innsbruck and Tyrol. The Los Gurkos Short Film Festival regularly works together with the International Film Festival Innsbruck and the Rejected Film Festival.

The Los Gurkos Short Film Festival is an open festival and does therefore not require entries to comply with a certain theme, but only with the technical guidelines. On November 9, 2013, the festival will take place for the ninth time at the PMK in Innsbruck. After the approximately ten best entries have been shown, an expert panel chooses the three winning shorts. The festival award has symbolic value: the Golden Cucumber (after dice in 2010, cucumber plants in 2011 and graffiti in 2012).

Winners of the goldene Gurke (golden cucumber)

Bands which have performed at the Los Gurkos Film Festival

References

Film festivals in Austria
Festivals in Innsbruck
Autumn events in Austria